Joseph Hafferty (born March 21, 1998) is an American soccer player who currently plays for MLS Next Pro side Tacoma Defiance.

Career

Youth
Hafferty has been with the Seattle Sounders FC Academy since 2013. On February 2, 2017, it was announced that he signed a letter of intent to play college soccer at Oregon State.  On March 26, he made his debut for USL club Seattle Sounders FC 2 in a 2–1 defeat to Sacramento Republic.

College
Hafferty played college soccer at Oregon State University, and was a three-time All-Pac-12 selection, including back-to-back First Team nods as a junior and senior. During his time with the Beavers, Hafferty made 61 appearances, scored 2 goals and tallied 7 assists. His senior season saw him start all 8 games in an abbreviated senior season due to the COVID-19 pandemic.

Professional
Hafferty was drafted by Inter Miami CF in the second round of the 2021 MLS SuperDraft. 

On May 16, 2021, it was announced that Seattle Sounders FC had acquired the rights on Hafferty from Inter Miami on draft day, and would join Seattle's USL Championship side Tacoma Defiance.

Hafferty transferred to the MLS Next Pro team Austin FC II on March 16, 2023, signing a one year contract with a two year option.

References

External links
Oregon State University bio
US Soccer Development Academy bio
USSF Development Academy bio (demosphere)

1998 births
Living people
American soccer players
Oregon State Beavers men's soccer players
Tacoma Defiance players
Association football defenders
Soccer players from Washington (state)
USL Championship players
People from Renton, Washington
Inter Miami CF draft picks
MLS Next Pro players